Jalsan (November 16, 1947 – April 28, 2013) was a politician, scholar, and Buddhist leader (tulku) in the People's Republic of China. He was of Mongol ethnicity.

Early life and education
Jalsan was born in Tianzhu Tibetan Autonomous County, Gansu, on the 13th day of the 12th month in the lunar calendar. He went to Alxa League, Inner Mongolia in 1958 to attend primary school. After his middle school graduation, he participated in the Down to the Countryside Movement. In 1978, he entered the M.A. programme in Mongolian language at the Inner Mongolia University. After his graduation, he went to Japan in 1985 to study for a further two years as an international student at the Tokyo University of Foreign Studies before returning to Gansu to study Tibetan at the Northwest University for Nationalities in 1988.

Politics
Jalsan served as a member of the Chinese People's Political Consultative Conference and the Standing Committee of the National People's Congress of the People's Republic of China.

Religious positions
Jalsan was a tulku of the Southern Temple of the Helan Mountains, the largest Buddhist temple in Inner Mongolia. He was also involved with a number of organisations relating to Buddhism in China: he is a board member of the Buddhist Association of China, president of the Buddhist Association of Inner Mongolia, and principal of the Buddhist School of Inner Mongolia.

Academic work
In the academic world, Jalsan was both a regular professor at the Inner Mongolia University and a visiting professor at the Northwest University for Nationalities.

Selected publications

; a Festschrift in honour of Professor Chinggeltei

References

External links

Jalsan's obituary 

1947 births
2013 deaths
People's Republic of China Buddhists
People from Wuwei
Tulkus
People's Republic of China politicians from Gansu
Educators from Gansu
Academic staff of Inner Mongolia University
Chinese people of Mongolian descent
Linguists from China
Writers from Gansu